The SplinterBike is an invention by Michael Thompson. It is a 100% wooden bicycle which only uses glue to hold everything together. No bolts or screws were used.

History 
On September 16, 2010, during the Tour of Britain, Michael Thompson (a veteran wood joiner) suggested to his friend James Tully (an amateur cyclist) that he could make a 100% wooden bicycle. James responded by saying that if Michael would build it, he would ride it.

To consolidate these bold statements the two made a £1 bet.

100% Wooden Bicycle Land Speed Record 
On August 18, 2011 the two made a successful attempt to set the 100% Wooden Bicycle Land Speed Record with an average speed of 11.3 MPH (18.2 km/h). Because this was the first 100% wooden bicycle, all they needed was a successful run to measure the speed.

Due to the use of a soft running track and mechanical failure, James was not able to drive the bike to higher speeds.

SplinterBikeHʌɪbrɪd 
The Hʌɪbrɪd is a derivative of the original SplinterBike. The idea behind the bicycle was to build an everyday bicycle with as much wood as possible. Some elements of a bicycle, like the drive section or brakes, are simply not realistic in wood.
However, the entire frame and the rims are made of wood (walnut and birch).

Thompson T-Bar Frame 
The frame uses a T shape for maximum strength, while maintaining the necessary flexibility. Other wooden framed bicycles use a tubular design, making the Hʌɪbrɪd unique.

See also 
 Bamboo bicycle
 Cardboard bicycle
 Chukudu wood bicycle
 Wooden bicycle

References 

Bicycles